Puerto Rico participated at the 2003 Pan American Games, held in Santo Domingo, Dominican Republic, from August 1 to August 17, 2003.

Medals

Gold

Jumping individual: Mark Watring on Sapphire

Men's horizontal bar: Tommy Ramos

Mixed Hobie Cat 16: Enrique Figueroa and Carla Malatrasi

Silver

Men's decathlon: Luiggy Llanos

Men's lightweight (60 kg): Alex de Jesús

Men's pommel horse: Luis Vargas

Women's doubles: Kristina Brandi and Vilmarie Castellvi

Bronze

Men's tournament: National team
Rick Apodaca, Carlos Arroyo, Larry Ayuso, Sharif Fajardo, Bobby Joe Hatton, Antonio Latimer, Jorge Rivera, Daniel Santiago, Orlando Santiago, Alejandro Carmona, Peter John Ramos and Richie Dalmau

Men's tournament: Ramón Hernández and Raúl Papaleo

Men's super heavyweight (+91 kg): Victor Bisbal

Men's épée individual: Víctor Bernier
Men's épée team: Víctor Bernier, David Bernier, Jonathan Peña and Marcos Peña

Men's double trap: Lucas Bennazar

Men's 58 kg: Kristian Meléndez

Women's singles: Kristina Brandi

Women's freestyle (63 kg): Mabel Fonseca

Results by event

Athletics

Track

Road

Decathlon

Basketball

Men's tournament
Rick Apodaca
Carlos Arroyo
Larry Ayuso
Sharif Fajardo
Bobby Joe Hatton
Antonio Latimer
Jorge Rivera
Daniel Santiago
Orlando Santiago
Alejandro Carmona
Peter John Ramos
Richie Dalmau
Head coach:
Unknown

Boxing

Swimming

Men's competitions

Women's competitions

See also
Puerto Rico at the 2002 Central American and Caribbean Games
Puerto Rico at the 2004 Summer Olympics

References
puertorico-herald vol 31
puertorico-herald vol 33

Nations at the 2003 Pan American Games
P
2003